Nicobarese may refer to:
Something of, from, or related to the Nicobar Islands, an archipelago in the Indian Ocean
Nicobarese people, the people of the islands
Nicobarese languages, a group of Austroasiatic languages